Dihydroorotate dehydrogenase (fumarate) (dihydroorotate oxidase, pyr4 (gene)) is an enzyme with systematic name (S)-dihydroorotate:fumarate oxidoreductase. This enzyme catalyses the following chemical reaction

 (S)-dihydroorotate + fumarate  orotate + succinate

This enzyme contains FMN.

References

External links 
 

EC 1.3.98